The Phasmatinae are a subfamily of stick insects in the family Phasmatidae. They contain at least three tribes; Bradley and Galil corrected the spelling to "Phasmatinae" and provides a key to tribes.

Tribes and genera
The Phasmida Species File lists three tribes:

Acanthomimini 
Authority: Günther, 1953; distribution Australasia
 Acanthomima Kirby, 1904
 Anophelepis Westwood, 1859
 Arphax Stål, 1875
 Echetlus (phasmid) Stål, 1875
 Mauritiophasma Cliquennois & Brock, 2004
 Vasilissa Kirby, 1896

Acanthoxylini 
Authority: Bradley & Galil, 1977
 Acanthoxyla Uvarov, 1944
 Argosarchus Hutton, 1898
 Clitarchus Stål, 1875
 Pseudoclitarchus Salmon, 1991
 Tepakiphasma Buckley & Bradler, 2010

Phasmatini 
Selected genera (mostly from Australasia and SE Asia):
 Acrophylla Gray, 1835
 Anchiale Stål, 1875
 Eurycnema Audinet-Serville, 1838
 Onchestus Stål, 1877
 Phasma Lichtenstein, 1796

Inclusion of Other Tribes
Some treatments include up to seven tribes in this subfamily.  The Clitumnini and Pharnaciini are here separated in a distinct subfamily Clitumninae, and while the Achriopterini and Stephanacridini have also been placed in the Phasmatinae, other authors treat them as tribes incertae sedis among the Phasmatidae as is done here.

References

External links

 Phasmid Study Group: Phasmatinae
 Phasmida Subfamily File: Phasmatinae

Phasmatidae
Phasmatodea subfamilies
Phasmatodea of Asia